The 1979 Football League Cup Final took place on 17 March 1979 at Wembley Stadium. It was the nineteenth Football League Cup final and the thirteenth to be played at Wembley. It was contested between Nottingham Forest and Southampton. Forest were the hot favourites to win being the holders of the League Cup and the reigning First Division champions. The match finished 3–2 to Forest. Forest's goals came from Garry Birtles (2) and Tony Woodcock. Southampton's goals came from David Peach and Nick Holmes.

Match details 

Source for team line-ups:

Road to Wembley

Nottingham Forest 
Forest began their defence of the competition with a replayed victory over Oldham Athletic, before a 5–0 win at Oxford United. That set up a clash with fellow First Division side Everton, and Forest won 3–2 at Goodison Park. A quarter-final win over Brighton & Hove Albion set up the semi-final with Third Division side Watford. Forest won the 1st leg at home 3–1, and the 2nd leg was scoreless, and thus Forest qualified for their second successive final.

Southampton 
Southampton began their run with wins over First Division Birmingham City and Derby County. In the fourth round they needed a replay to beat Fourth Division side Reading; Southampton then defeated Manchester City 2–1 in the quarter-final. In the first leg of their semi-final with Leeds United they drew 2–2 away, before a 1–0 second leg victory.

References

External links 
 Yesterday's Hero - Yesterday's Hero movie Wikipedia Page

EFL Cup Finals
League Cup Final 1979
League Cup Final 1979
1978–79 Football League
League Cup Final 1979
Football League Cup Final 1979